Swimming has been a regular Asian Games sport since the first edition in 1951. Swimming has been the most gold medal sport event next to Athletics, with 41 of 465 gold medals in 2018 edition.

As of the last Asian Games in 2018, Japan is the most successful team in this sport event, with China following in the second place. Singapore was the best nation in the inaugural event, and are now fourth overall.

Editions

Events

Men's events

Women's events

Mixed

Medal table

List of records

List of medalists

References 
 Sports 123: Asian Games

External links 
 Olympic Council of Asia - Games

 
Sports at the Asian Games
Asian Games